The Underdog is a 2015 studio album by Texas country music artist Aaron Watson. It was released on February 17, 2015 via Big Label Records. It debuted at number one on the Billboard Top Country Albums chart, selling 26,340 copies in its first week of release.  The album has sold 82,900 copies in the US as of March 2017.

Track listing

Personnel
 Eddie Bayers - drums
 Milo Deering - fiddle
 Dan Dugmore - steel guitar
 Stuart Duncan - fiddle
 Larry Franklin - fiddle
 Paul Franklin - steel guitar
 Wes Hightower - background vocals
 Brent Mason - electric guitar
 Billy Panda - acoustic guitar
 Gary Prim - Hammond B-3 organ, piano
 John Wesley Ryles - background vocals
 Jimmie Lee Sloas - bass guitar
 Bobby Terry - acoustic guitar
 Bruce Watkins - banjo
 Aaron Watson - acoustic guitar, lead vocals
 John Willis - banjo

Chart performance

Weekly charts

Year-end charts

Singles

References

2015 albums
Aaron Watson albums
Albums produced by Keith Stegall